Rubus nebulosus is a species of shrub in the genus Rubus in the family Rosaceae.

References

nebulosus
Flora of New South Wales
Plants described in 1995